PM2FAP (90.4 FM), on-air name 90.4 Cosmopolitan FM, is a radio station in Jakarta, Indonesia. It is under license of Cosmopolitan magazine and is the only station in the world that uses Cosmopolitan magazine's name.
Radio Muara Abdinusa has then completely abandoned its dangdut programming in 14 February 2002. Today, Radio Muara Abdinusa only broadcasts Contemporary Hits Radio programming

Jingles
Cosmopolitan FM Jingle from 2002–present
 Your Personal Station, 90,4 Cosmopolitan FM

References

Radio stations in Jakarta